Afroneta picta is a species of sheet weaver found in the Congo. It was described by Swedish biologist  in 1968.

References

Linyphiidae
Endemic fauna of the Democratic Republic of the Congo
Spiders of Africa
Spiders described in 1968